Gerald Joseph Spitz (June 23, 1941 – December 5, 2013) was an American politician who served as a Republican member of the Pennsylvania House of Representatives for the 162nd district from 1977 to 1984.

Early life and education
Spitz was born in Ridley Park, Pennsylvania and attended Ridley Park High School.  He received a B.A. from Pennsylvania Military College in 1963 and a J.D. from Dickinson Law School in 1966.

He served as 1st lieutenant in the 101st airborne in the United States Army from 1966 to 1969 during the Vietnam War.

Career
Spitz served as Deputy District Attorney and as Special Prosecutor for Delaware County.

He was elected to the Pennsylvania House of Representatives for the 162nd district and served from 1977 to 1984.  He was not a candidate for reelection in 1985.

He worked as an Administrative Law Judge for the United States Social Security Administration.

Spitz died on December 5, 2013, of sarcoidosis. He was 72.

He is interred at the Edgewood Memorial Park in Glen Mills, Pennsylvania.

References

1941 births
2013 deaths
20th-century American politicians
United States Army personnel of the Vietnam War
American judges
Dickinson School of Law alumni
County district attorneys in Pennsylvania
Republican Party members of the Pennsylvania House of Representatives
Pennsylvania lawyers
People from Ridley Park, Pennsylvania
Widener University alumni
20th-century American judges
20th-century American lawyers
Deaths from sarcoidosis